Yan Long'an (born September 16, 1937) is a Chinese agronomist best known for developing the hybrid rice "Shan-You 2". He has been hailed as "Mother of Hybrid Rice". He is an academician of the Chinese Academy of Engineering. He is a member of the Communist Party of China. He was a delegate to the 5th, 6th, 7th, 8th and 9th National People's Congress.

Biography
Yan was born in Dongqiao Township of Pingxiang, Jiangxi, on September 16, 1937. In 1958, he was accepted to Jiangxi Agricultural College (now Jiangxi Agricultural University), where he majored in the Department of Agriculture. After graduating in 1962, he was dispatched to Pingxiang Agriculture Bureau as a technician. In 1970, he was transferred to Pingxiang Agricultural Science Institute, where he was promoted to director in 1983. He joined the Communist Party of China in October 1970. In 1995, he was appointed party chief and president of Jiangxi Academy of Agricultural Sciences, and served until 1998.

Honours and awards
 2007 Member of the Chinese Academy of Engineering (CAE)

References

1937 births
Living people
People from Pingxiang
Scientists from Jiangxi
Jiangxi Agricultural University alumni
Delegates to the 5th National People's Congress
Delegates to the 6th National People's Congress
Delegates to the 7th National People's Congress
Delegates to the 8th National People's Congress
Delegates to the 9th National People's Congress
Members of the Chinese Academy of Engineering